Lambda Crateris, Latinized from λ Crateris, is the Bayer designation for a suspected binary star system in the southern constellation of Crater. With an annual parallax shift of 23.32 milliarcsecond as observed from Earth, it is located around 140 light years from the Sun. It is faintly visible to the naked eye with an apparent visual magnitude of 5.08.

This is a probable astrometric binary star system, with orbital elements first reported by Abt and Levy (1976). However, Morbey and Griffin (1987) later cast some doubt on the validity of these results, suggesting that further review is needed. The visible member of this system, component A, is an evolved F-type giant star with a stellar classification of F5 III. It has an estimated 1.78 times the mass of the Sun and 2.8 times the Sun's radius. The star is spinning with a projected rotational velocity of 17 km/s.

References

F-type giants
Spectroscopic binaries
Crater (constellation)
Crateris, Lambda
Durchmusterung objects
Crateris, 13
098991
055598
4395
Astrometric binaries